Yaacov Breir (born 1910) was an Israeli footballer who played as a full-back for Hapoel Haifa and the Mandatory Palestine national team.

Breir took part in Mandatory Palestine's last international match against Lebanon in 1940; it was his only international cap.

References

External links
 

1910 births
Year of death missing
Jewish Israeli sportspeople
Jewish footballers
Association football fullbacks
Mandatory Palestine footballers
Israeli footballers
Mandatory Palestine international footballers
Hapoel Haifa F.C. players